Ludwig Häfner (17 February 1921 – 10 November 1942) was a German Luftwaffe ace and recipient of the Knight's Cross of the Iron Cross during World War II. The Knight's Cross of the Iron Cross was awarded to recognise extreme battlefield bravery or successful military leadership. On 10 November 1942, Ludwig Häfner was killed north of Stalingrad after he was attacked by a large number of Yak fighters. He was posthumously awarded the Knight's Cross on 21 December 1942. During his career he was credited with 52 aerial victories, all on the Eastern Front.

Awards 
 Aviator badge
 Front Flying Clasp of the Luftwaffe
 Ehrenpokal der Luftwaffe (21 September 1942)
 Iron Cross (1939)
 2nd Class
 1st Class
 German Cross in Gold on 25 September 1942 as Leutnant in the 6./Jagdgeschwader 3
 Knight's Cross of the Iron Cross on 21 December 1942 as Leutnant and pilot in the 6./Jagdgeschwader 3

Notes

References

Citations

Bibliography

External links 
 Aces of the Luftwaffe
 TracesOfWar.com

1921 births
1942 deaths
Military personnel from Ingolstadt
Luftwaffe pilots
German World War II flying aces
Recipients of the Gold German Cross
Recipients of the Knight's Cross of the Iron Cross
Luftwaffe personnel killed in World War II
Aviators killed by being shot down